Yio Chu Kang MRT station is an above-ground Mass Rapid Transit (MRT) station on the North South line in Ang Mo Kio, Singapore, near the junction of Ang Mo Kio Avenue 6 and Ang Mo Kio Avenue 8.

This station primarily serves students of adjacent educational institutions such as Anderson Serangoon Junior College and Nanyang Polytechnic, as well as the residential and industrial estates in the northern part of Ang Mo Kio.

The section of tracks between this station and Khatib MRT station is the longest between any two stations on the MRT network. Opened on 7 November 1987, Yio Chu Kang station is one of the five stations that collectively make up Singapore's oldest MRT stations.

History

In initial plans for the MRT system, Yio Chu Kang station was to be built under the second phase of the system's development, but was moved to the system's first phase in 1983, over concerns that Ang Mo Kio station could not cope with commuters from Yio Chu Kang. The contract for the construction of Yio Chu Kang station, along with the adjacent Ang Mo Kio station and the overground tracks connecting the two stations to Bishan station and Bishan Depot, was awarded to Paul Y Construction in October 1984 at a sum of $62.66 million. The station was completed by April 1987, and it opened on 7 November 1987, as part of the first section of the MRT system.

Installation of half-height platform screen doors began on 15 August 2011, and they commenced operation on 18 October that year.

Incidents
On 3 March 2003, a 23-year-old drove his car onto an MRT track off Lentor Avenue, in the sector between Yio Chu Kang and Khatib, the first accident of its kind in the 15 years of MRT operations in Singapore. Witnesses tried to remove the car from the tracks to prevent a possible collision, however an oncoming train from Yio Chu Kang stopped their efforts. One of the witnesses signalled the train driver to stop. Although the train driver was not able to stop in time, he was able to slow the train down enough to prevent derailment.

Station details

Location
The station is located on a plot of land adjacent to Ang Mo Kio Avenues 8,6 and 9. It is located near landmarks such as Anderson Serangoon Junior College, Nanyang Polytechnic, Yio Chu Kang Stadium and Presbyterian High School.

Services
The station is served by the North South line, between Khatib and Ang Mo Kio, and has the station code NS15 on official maps. Trains run at 2 to 5 minute intervals during peak hours, and at 5 minute intervals at other times.

Station design
The station was designed by Mott, Hay and Anderson, and it consists of a ticketing concourse on the ground floor and the station platforms on the upper level. The ticketing concourse is encircled by glass walls, while the platforms are open to the surroundings. These features, along with slim columns clad in tiles, are intended to give the station a bright and graceful look.

References

External links

 

Railway stations in Singapore opened in 1987
Buildings and structures in Ang Mo Kio
Mass Rapid Transit (Singapore) stations
Railway stations in North-East Region, Singapore